PXM may refer to:

 PXM, the IATA code for the Puerto Escondido International Airport
 pxm, the file extension used by the Pixelmator image editing software
 pxm, the ISO 693 code for the Quetzaltepec Mixe language, a variety of Midland Mixe
 PXM, the acronym for processor switch modules in computer networks
 PXM, the acronym for Product eXperience Management